Michael Dunkin Penberthy (born November 29, 1974) is an American professional basketball coach and former player. A point guard from The Master's College (now The Master's University), Penberthy went undrafted in the 1997 NBA draft but played for the Los Angeles Lakers, winning an NBA championship in 2001.

Early life and college
Born in Los Gatos, California, Penberthy graduated from Herbert Hoover High School at Fresno, California in 1993. He played college basketball for The Master's College in Santa Clarita, California, where he played with distinction, broke numerous school records (including most career points), was a 2-time NAIA All-American, and was later a charter member of the college for the 2003–2004 season. He held the NAIA record for consecutive games with at least one three-pointer made, with 111, until it was broken in December 2005 by Brandon Cole of John Brown University. He graduated from The Master's College in 1997 with a B.A. degree in biblical studies.

Professional career
Penberthy tried out for the Indiana Pacers and tore his right hamstring; he took three months off and joined the Continental Basketball Association team Idaho Stampede, which drafted him from college. The Stampede cut Penberthy, who said he "hated" playing there, and he transferred to the German team Hamburg Tigers.

During the summer of 1998, when the NBA locked out its players, Penberthy worked as a forklift driver at Turf Tek, a company managed by a cousin of his. The following fall, Penberthy joined sports ministry Athletes in Action and the CBA team Quad City Thunder but was cut due to a sprained right ankle. From April to June 1999, Penberthy played for the Venezuelan team Cocodrilos de Caracas.

In his NBA career, Penberthy played in 56 games, all with the Lakers, and had averages of 4.9 points, 1.3 assists and 1.2 rebounds per game while playing 15.4 minutes per game on average. He won an NBA championship with the team in 2000–01.

The Lakers waived Penberthy on November 10, 2001.  Afterwards, he played basketball in Italy and Germany and competed in the ULEB Cups of 2005, 2006, and 2007. While with Alba Berlin, Penberthy helped the team win the German Cup of 2006. In 2011, Penberthy signed with the Los Angeles Slam of the ABA.

Coaching career
In the 2014–15 season, Penberthy was the shooting coach for the Minnesota Timberwolves. In the 2018–19 season, Penberthy was the shooting coach for the New Orleans Pelicans. In the summer of 2019, Penberthy was hired as an assistant coach for the Los Angeles Lakers. Penberthy won his second championship when the Lakers defeated the Miami Heat in the 2020 NBA Finals in 6 games.

Personal life
Penberthy married Wendy Jones, who attended The Master's College with him and played volleyball for the college. They have three children. Ty, Jaden and Kate.

References

External links
 
 

1974 births
Living people
Alba Berlin players
American expatriate basketball people in Germany
American expatriate basketball people in Italy
American expatriate basketball people in Venezuela
American men's basketball players
Basket Napoli players
Basketball coaches from California
Basketball players from California
Cocodrilos de Caracas players
Los Angeles Lakers assistant coaches
Los Angeles Lakers players
The Master's Mustangs men's basketball players
New Orleans Pelicans assistant coaches
Pallacanestro Reggiana players
People from Los Gatos, California
Point guards
Sportspeople from Fresno, California
Sportspeople from Santa Clara County, California
Undrafted National Basketball Association players